Herbert Wagner may refer to:

 Herbert A. Wagner (1900–1982), Austrian scientist and engineer
 Herbert Appleton Wagner, one of the founders of the Wagner Electric Corporation
 Herbert Wagner (politician) (born 1948), mayor of Dresden
 Herbert Wagner (physicist) (born 1935), German physicist
 Herbert Wagner (general) (1896–1968), Generalleutnant in the Wehrmacht during World War II

See also 
 Herb Wagner (1920–2000), American botanist